Clepsis parassensus is a species of moth of the family Tortricidae. It is found in Ecuador (Pichincha-Septimo Paraiso Reserve).

The wingspan is about 11 mm for males and about 15 mm for females. The ground colour of the forewings is pale brownish, sprinkled with brown and creamy along the brown markings. The hindwings are pale brownish grey.

Etymology
The species name refers to the similarity with Clepsis assensus plus para (meaning near, close).

References

Moths described in 2004
Clepsis